The Chemistry Building at the University of Arkansas is a building on the University's campus in Fayetteville, Arkansas. The building was added to the National Register of Historic Places in 1992.

History
Although there was already a chemistry building on campus, by 1925 it had become too small. There were plans to build a new building by the Arkansas General Assembly in 1927, and was scheduled to be built in 1931. However, the Great Depression delayed these plans.

In January 1934, $1,165,000 was made available for the construction of both a new chemistry building and Vol Walker Library. These funds came from the Public Works Administration, and not the Arkansas legislature.

Opened in December 1935, the building housed the chemistry, zoology, geology, philosophy, and psychology departments. Eventually, the growing University forced all of these departments elsewhere except for chemistry. In 1992, the University added another chemistry building adjacent to this one, connected with a skywalk.

See also
National Register of Historic Places listings in Washington County, Arkansas

References

External links
 U of A Chemistry Building profile
 University of Arkansas

University of Arkansas buildings
University and college buildings on the National Register of Historic Places in Arkansas
School buildings completed in 1935
Public Works Administration in Arkansas
National Register of Historic Places in Fayetteville, Arkansas
University and college buildings completed in 1935
1935 establishments in Arkansas